The Turkey national korfball team is managed by the Turkish Korfball Committee (TKC), representing Turkey in korfball international competitions.

Tournament history

Current squad
National team in the 2009 European Bowl

 Coach: Daniel De Rudder

References 

National korfball teams
Korfball
National team